A by-election was held in the Wimmera electorate in regional Victoria on 9 February 1946, following the resignation of independent MP Alexander Wilson.

Results

References

1946 elections in Australia
Victorian federal by-elections
1940s in Victoria (Australia)
February 1946 events in Australia